Vasuki Parbat South is a mountain of the Garhwal Himalaya in Uttarakhand, India. It is 49th highest located entirely within the Uttrakhand. Nanda Devi, is the highest mountain in this category. It lies 1.6 km south of Vasuki Parbat its nearest higher neighbor  and 2.7 km east of Bhagirathi Parbat I . It is located 4.6 km SE of Bhagirathi Parbat II  and 4.1 km SE lies Satopanth .

Gangotri National Park
The entire surrounding area are protected within the  Gangotri National Park, one of the largest conservation area in India. The Gangotri National Park is home to several world-class treks, including Gangotri Gomukh Tapoban Nandanvan, Kerdarnath Vasuki tal trek, Har ki dun valley trek,  Badrinath to Satopanth tal trek, Gangotri to Kedar tal trek, Gangotri to Badrinath trek via Kalindi khal and many more.

Climbing history
In 1984 A six-man Japanese expedition led by Kijoji Aizawa when failed to climb Bhagirathi I, one of the members, Takaaki Fujii made a solo ascent of P 6702 (21,988 feet) on September 24.

September 4, 1988 three Italians Massimo Marchegianni, Tiziano Cantalamessa and Marcello Ceci claimed the first ascent of Vasuki Parbat South (21,988 feet). They reached the summit in alpine-style in four days climbing the east face. They approached the peak via Nandanban and the Chaturangi Glacier and Sundar Glacier.

Neighboring and subsidiary peaks
neighboring peaks of Vasuki Parbat South:
 Vasuki Parbat, 6,792m (22,283 ft), 
 Satopanth, 7,075m (23,212 ft), 
 Bhagirathi Parbat I, 6,856m (22493 ft)
 Bhagirathi Parbat II, 6,512m (21365 ft)
 Bhagirathi Parbat III, 6,454m (21175 ft)
 Shivling, 6,543m (21467 ft)

Glaciers and rivers
Vasuki Parbat is surrounded by the Vasuki Glacier on the west side and Sundar Bamak (Glacier) on the east side northern side is surrounded by Chaturangi Glacier. Vasuki Glacier and Sundar Glacier merge with Chaturangi Glacier. Chaturangi Glacier merge with Gangotri Glacier from the snout of Gangotri Glacier emerges Bhagirathi river also called Ganga or Ganges after it meets Alaknanda at Dev Pryag.

See also

 List of Himalayan peaks of Uttarakhand

References

Mountains of Uttarakhand
Six-thousanders of the Himalayas
Geography of Chamoli district